The 1940 United States Senate election in Indiana took place on November 5, 1940. Incumbent Democratic U.S. Senator Sherman Minton ran for re-election to a second term, but lost narrowly to Republican Raymond E. Willis.

General election

Candidates
 John H. Kingsbury (Socialist)
Sherman Minton, incumbent Senator since 1935 (Democratic)
Carl W. Thompson (Prohibition)
Raymond E. Willis, former State Representative from Angola and nominee for Senate in 1938 (Republican)

Results

See also 
 1940 United States Senate elections

References

Indiana
1940
1940 Indiana elections